A list of films produced by the Tollywood (Bengali language film industry) based in Kolkata in the year 1978.

A-Z of films

References

External links

1978
Lists of 1978 films by country or language
Films, Bengali